The city-province (ville-province in French) of Kinshasa is divided into 24 communes (municipalities).

The 24 communes of Kinshasa

Source : Institut National de la Statistique (INS)

External links
https://web.archive.org/web/20091217065225/http://www.congonline.com/geo/kinshasa.htm